This article presents the complete oeuvre of American singer-songwriter Dogbowl, also known as Stephen Tunney, including his work as a band member and as a collaborating artist.

As a Solo artist

Studio albums

Collaborative albums

Live albums

Compilation albums

With King Missile

Other credits

References

External links

Discographies of American artists
Rock music discographies